Novi Karlovci is a village in Serbia. It is situated in the Autonomous Province of Vojvodina, in the region of Syrmia (Syrmia District), in Inđija municipality. In 2002, its population was 3,036, including 2,897 (95.42%) Serbs.

Name
The name of the village in Serbian is plural.

Tourism
International hiking- and bikingroute Sultans Trail goes thru Novi Karlovci. Both routes follow the old route from Budapest to Istanbul

Historical population

1961: 3,427
1971: 3,060
1981: 3,050
1991: 2,947

See also
List of places in Serbia
List of cities, towns and villages in Vojvodina

References
Slobodan Ćurčić, Broj stanovnika Vojvodine, Novi Sad, 1996.

External links 

Novi Karlovci

Populated places in Syrmia